Spies at Work is a 1933 German thriller film directed by Gerhard Lamprecht and starring Karl Ludwig Diehl, Brigitte Helm, and Eduard von Winterstein. A spy film, it is set during the First World War conflict between Austria and Italy.

The film's sets were designed by the art director Karl Weber and Erich Zander. The film was shot at the Babelsberg Studios in Berlin. A British version On Secret Service was also made.

Cast

References

Bibliography

External links

1933 films
1930s spy thriller films
German spy thriller films
Films of the Weimar Republic
Films of Nazi Germany
1930s German-language films
Films directed by Gerhard Lamprecht
World War I spy films
Films set in Austria
Films set in Italy
UFA GmbH films
Cine-Allianz films
German black-and-white films
Films shot at Babelsberg Studios
1930s German films